The 1985 Los Angeles Raiders season was their 26th in the league. They improved upon their previous season's output of 11–5, winning 12 games. The team qualified for the playoffs for the fourth straight season. Two close victories over Denver towards the end of the season gave Los Angeles the division title, while Denver missed the playoffs despite an 11–5 record.

Before the season

Draft

Personnel

Staff

Roster

Schedule

Playoffs

Season summary

Week 1

    
    
    
    
    

Dokie Williams 5 Rec, 131 Yds

Week 10 at Chargers

Week 14 at Broncos

Standings

MVP
Running Back Marcus Allen earned the 1985 league MVP with Walter Payton of the Chicago Bears finishing as the runner-up.  Allen started all 16 games and caught 67 passes for 2,314 total yards (1,759 rushing yards) and 14 total touchdowns (11 rushing touchdowns).  His longest run was 61 yards, his longest reception was 44 yards, and he ran for 4.6 yards per carry.  He also completed 1 of 2 passes for 16 yards for zero touchdowns.

Pro Bowlers

The 1985 Raiders had four players make it to the Pro Bowl.  They were Marcus Allen, Todd Christensen, Mike Haynes, and Howie Long.

References

Los Angeles Raiders seasons
Los Angeles Raiders
AFC West championship seasons
Los